South Korea (IOC designation:Korea) participated in the 1970 Asian Games held in Bangkok, Thailand from December 9, 1970 to December 20, 1970.

Medal summary

Medal table

Medalists

References

Korea, South
1970
Asian Games